Succinimidyl 4-(N-maleimidomethyl)cyclohexane-1-carboxylate (SMCC) is a heterobifunctional amine-to-sulfhydryl crosslinker, which contains two reactive groups at opposite ends: N-hydroxysuccinimide-ester and maleimide, reactive with amines and thiols respectively. SMCC is often used in bioconjugation to link proteins with other functional entities (fluorescent dyes, tracers, nanoparticles, cytotoxic agents). For example, a targeted anticancer agent – trastuzumab emtansine (antibody-drug conjugate containing an antibody trastuzumab chemically linked to a highly potent drug DM-1) – is prepared using SMCC reagent.

References

Reagents for biochemistry
Maleimides
Succinimides